Australian pop rock band 5 Seconds of Summer have released five studio albums, two live albums, seven extended plays, 26 singles, four promotional singles, and 25 music videos. All four of their studio albums debuted at number one in Australia and all have debuted at number one, within the top three, and within top 10 on a multitude of charts in many other countries. According to Billboard, since 2014, 5 Seconds of Summer have sold more than ten million albums, sold over two million concert tickets worldwide, and the band's songs streams surpass seven billion, making them one of Australia's most successful musical exports in history.

On 5 February 2014, 5 Seconds of Summer's debut single "She Looks So Perfect" was released. It debuted at number one in four countries, including the United Kingdom, where 5 Seconds of Summer became the fourth Australian band to top the UK Singles Chart and the first since "Don't Call Me Baby" by Madison Avenue in May 2000. On 13 May 2014, the band announced their debut album, named 5 Seconds of Summer, which was released on 22 July 2014. It debuted at number one in Australia and the US. On 23 October 2015, the band released their second album Sounds Good Feels Good. The album peaked at number one in the charts of ten countries, including Australia, Canada, Ireland, the UK and the US. The band released "Jet Black Heart" as the third and final single from the album. It peaked at number thirty-four in Australia, number sixty in the UK, number seventy-eight in Ireland and number ninety-five in the US.

On 22 February 2018, the band released "Want You Back", the lead single from their third studio album. It peaked within the top 40 of the charts in the United Kingdom, Ireland, and Australia. The second single was "Youngblood", which reached worldwide success and peaked at number one for eight consecutive weeks in Australia and four consecutive weeks in New Zealand. On 15 June 2018, the band released their third studio album Youngblood. The album was a commercial success and debuted at number one in Australia and the US. On 27 March 2020, the band released their fourth studio album Calm which was a commercial success and received generally positive reviews from critics. The album charted in more than 25 countries on several charts, and debuted atop the charts at number one in Australia and  the United Kingdom. The album peaked in the top 10 on 17 charts, including number two in Mexico and number four in Austria, Estonia, Ireland, New Zealand and Portugal.

All singles from the band's four studio albums, as well as all four albums, have charted in a substantial number of countries, received multiple official sales certifications and have been featured in a large amount of weekly and year-end charts, as well as making an appearance on decade-end charts.

Albums

Studio albums

Live albums

Extended plays

Singles

As lead artists

As featured artists

Promotional singles

Other charted or certified songs

Other appearances

Video albums

Music videos

Notes

References

Sources

discography
Pop music group discographies
Rock music group discographies
Discographies of Australian artists